Varessia is a former commune in the Jura department in the Bourgogne-Franche-Comté region in eastern France. On 1 January 2016, it was merged into the new commune of La Chailleuse. Its population was 33 in 2018.

See also 
 Communes of the Jura department

References 

Former communes of Jura (department)